Andrew Currie may refer to:

Andrew Currie (sculptor) (1813–1891), Scottish
Andrew Currie (businessman) (born 1955), British businessman
Andrew Currie (director) (born 1973), Canadian film director and screenwriter
Andrew Currie, Canadian football player and coach with the Winnipeg Blue Bombers